The 2013 CFL season was the 60th season of modern-day Canadian football. Officially, it was the 56th season of the Canadian Football League.

The pre-season began on June 12, 2013 and the regular season began on June 27, 2013. Regina, Saskatchewan hosted the 101st Grey Cup on November 24, with the Cup won by the Saskatchewan Roughriders.

CFL news in 2013

Salary cap
According to a new collective bargaining agreement, the 2013 salary cap was set at $4,400,000. As per the agreement, the cap is fixed and does not vary with league revenue performance. The minimum team salary was set at $4,000,000, with individual minimum salaries set at $45,000.

Season schedule
The 2013 season schedule was released on March 5, 2013, with the regular season opening on June 27 at the new Investors Group Field in Winnipeg, Manitoba. This was the first time Winnipeg had opened the regular season since 1998 and the first brand new Canadian stadium in the CFL since Toronto's SkyDome opened in 1989 (the Alamodome opened in 1993 with the now defunct San Antonio Texans playing there in 1995). For the second time in three years, the Toronto Argonauts and Hamilton Tiger-Cats did not play in their Labour Day Classic matchup, due to scheduling conflicts for both teams. Following the previous year's experiment, the league held all division matchups not only in the last week, but for the final four weeks in total, hoping for a tight playoff race. There were 15 double headers, with one on a Thursday, three on Fridays, nine on Saturdays, one on a Sunday, and the traditional Thanksgiving contests on a Monday.

Bye weeks
For the second consecutive year, the teams' bye weeks occurred in the sixth and seventh weeks of the season, earlier than the usual eighth and ninth week setup that had been in place since 2007. These began over the August Civic Holiday, suggesting that this was done to accommodate for fans' vacation plans.

Stadium changes
The Hamilton Tiger-Cats played 2013 home games at Alumni Stadium in Guelph, with the exception of Touchdown Atlantic (see below). The team's previous venue, Ivor Wynne Stadium, was demolished during the offseason, and its replacement, Tim Hortons Field, would not be ready until at least 2014. For the first time in decades, the Tiger-Cats did not host the Labour Day Classic and instead traveled to Vancouver to face the BC Lions that weekend. Because Ontario University Athletics (of which Alumni Stadium's primary tenants, the Guelph Gryphons, are a member) also has a tradition of playing football games on Labour Day, finding a suitable venue within Southern Ontario would have been impossible. The Toronto at Hamilton matchup was instead played as the nightcap in the 2013 Thanksgiving Day Classic.

The Winnipeg Blue Bombers finally took residence at the new Investors Group Field. The stadium was supposed to have been readied in 2012, but construction delays pushed back the opening to the 2013 season. The Toronto Argonauts hosted the Montreal Alouettes at the University of Toronto's Varsity Stadium for their preseason game, the first Argonauts game at Varsity Stadium in 55 years.

Return of Touchdown Atlantic
After a one-year hiatus in 2012, Touchdown Atlantic returned for the 2013 season with the Hamilton Tiger-Cats hosting the Montreal Alouettes on September 21, 2013. This was the third regular season instalment of the game and the second to feature the Tiger-Cats. This was the first appearance for the Alouettes and it was also the first matchup to feature division opponents.

Media
On March 21, 2013, the CFL announced it had renewed its exclusive contract with TSN to televise all CFL games through 2018; the contract included the national radio rights to the Grey Cup, which would air on TSN Radio and The Team. The contract had originally been set to expire at the end of the 2013 season.

As with the previous contract, the league had no games broadcast on terrestrial television, prolonging an absence dating to 2007 and making it the largest league in North America without over-the-air television broadcasts.

On June 21, 2013, the CFL announced it had renewed its distribution deal with NBC Sports Network for United States broadcasts and that ESPN2 would also pick up five additional games for live broadcast. ESPN3 continued to serve as the league's online broadcaster.

Rule changes

On April 10, 2013 the CFL Board of Governors approved 2 new rules. The first stated that coaches would be allowed to challenge the result of a field goal attempt or extra point attempt. The second rule gave coaches more flexibility on when they can use their timeouts. Coaches could now use both of their time outs at any point during regulation time of a game, as long as they didn't use more than one after the three-minute warning was sounded in the second half of the game. In the past coaches were only allowed to use one time out per half.

Coaching changes
Immediately following the close of the 2012 CFL season it seemed probable that there would be no head coaching changes in the off-season. 

However, after a disappointing 6–12 regular season the Hamilton Tiger-Cats fired George Cortez. The expectations on the Ticats were very high after the off-season acquisitions of Henry Burris and Andy Fantuz which Cortez failed to live up to. The Tiger-Cats replaced Cortez with Kent Austin. Austin, who won the 95th Grey Cup with the  Saskatchewan Roughriders, had been the offensive coordinator at the University of Mississippi and the head coach of Cornell University for 3 years each.

In mid-January, 2013, the Montreal Alouettes lost their head coach Marc Trestman to the Chicago Bears of the NFL. Trestman won two Grey Cups in five seasons as the head coach of the Alouettes from 2008 to 2012. On February 19 the Alouettes announced that Dan Hawkins would be the new head coach. Hawkins had been the head coach of Willamette University, Boise State and University of Colorado from 1993 to 2010.

Dan Hawkins was fired on August 1, 2013, after a 2–3 start to the season. Longtime general manager Jim Popp was interim head coach for the remainder of the season.

Tim Burke was fired on November 12, 2013 after the Winnipeg Blue Bombers finished last in the league with a dismal 3–15 record.

Trade deadline
The deadline for teams to complete trades was Wednesday October 9 at 3:59pm EDT.

Regular season

Structure

Teams played eighteen regular season games, playing two of the three divisional opponents three times, the other four times, and teams from the opposing division twice. Teams were awarded two points for a win and one point for a tie. The top three teams in each division qualified for the playoffs, with the first place team gaining a bye to the divisional finals. A fourth place team in one division could qualify ahead of the third place team in the other division (the "Crossover"), if they earned more points in the season.

If two or more teams in the same division were equal in points, the following tiebreakers applied: 

a) Most wins in all games
b) Head to head winning percentage (matches won divided by all matches played)
c) Head to head points difference
d) Head to head points ratio
e–g) Tiebreakers b–d applied sequentially to all divisional games
h–i) Tiebreakers c–d applied sequentially to all league games
j) Coin toss

Notes:

1. If two clubs remained tied after other club(s) are eliminated during any step, tie breakers reverted to step a).
2. Tiebreakers did not apply to the Crossover. To cross over a team must have more points than the third place team.

Standings

Note: GP = Games Played, W = Wins, L = Losses, T = Ties, PF = Points For, PA = Points Against, Pts = Points

Teams in bold are in playoff positions.

Weekly results

2013 average attendance

 Saskatchewan	37,503
 Edmonton	32,095
 Winnipeg	30,637
 Calgary	29,262
 BC            28,310
 Montreal	23,004
 Toronto	21,926
 Hamilton	13,298

CFL playoffs
The Calgary Stampeders were first to clinch a playoff berth, in Week 12 of the schedule. Toronto and BC followed in Week 14, followed by Saskatchewan and Hamilton in Week 15, and the final playoff spot was clinched by Montreal in Week 17. Three of the four home playoff hosts were determined in Week 17.

The Saskatchewan Roughriders won their fourth Grey Cup championship on home turf at Mosaic Stadium at Taylor Field by defeating the Hamilton Tiger-Cats, 45–23. Roughriders' running back Kory Sheets was named the MVP, while Roughriders' slotback, Chris Getzlaf was named the Grey Cup's Most Valuable Canadian.

Playoff bracket

*-Team won in Overtime.

Award winners

CFL Player of the Week

Source

CFL Player of the Month

Source

2013 CFL All-Stars

Offence
QB – Ricky Ray, Toronto Argonauts
RB – Jon Cornish, Calgary Stampeders
RB – Kory Sheets, Saskatchewan Roughriders
R – S. J. Green, Montreal Alouettes
R – Fred Stamps, Edmonton Eskimos
R – Marquay McDaniel, Calgary Stampeders
R – Weston Dressler, Saskatchewan Roughriders
OT – Stanley Bryant, Calgary Stampeders
OT – Jovan Olafioye, BC Lions
OG – Brendon LaBatte, Saskatchewan Roughriders
OG – Chris Van Zeyl, Toronto Argonauts
OC – Jeff Keeping, Toronto Argonauts

Defence
DT – Khalif Mitchell, Toronto Argonauts
DT – Almondo Sewell, Edmonton Eskimos
DE – Alex Hall, Saskatchewan Roughriders
DE – Charleston Hughes, Calgary Stampeders
LB – Chip Cox, Montreal Alouettes
LB – Adam Bighill, BC Lions
LB – Henoc Muamba, Winnipeg Blue Bombers
CB – Geoff Tisdale, Montreal Alouettes
CB – Pat Watkins, Toronto Argonauts
DB – Jerald Brown, Montreal Alouettes
DB – Ryan Phillips, BC Lions
S – Tyron Brackenridge, Saskatchewan Roughriders

Special teams
K – Rene Paredes, Calgary Stampeders
P – Rob Maver, Calgary Stampeders
ST – Larry Taylor, Calgary Stampeders

2013 CFL Western All-Stars

Offence
QB – Darian Durant, Saskatchewan Roughriders
RB – Jon Cornish, Calgary Stampeders
RB – Kory Sheets, Saskatchewan Roughriders
R – Weston Dressler, Saskatchewan Roughriders
R – Chris Getzlaf, Saskatchewan Roughriders
R – Marquay McDaniel, Calgary Stampeders
R – Fred Stamps, Edmonton Eskimos
OT – Stanley Bryant, Calgary Stampeders
OT – Jovan Olafioye, BC Lions
OG – Brendon LaBatte, Saskatchewan Roughriders
OG – Jon Gott, Calgary Stampeders
OC – Brett Jones, Calgary Stampeders

Defence
DT – Tearrius George, Saskatchewan Roughriders
DT – Almondo Sewell, Edmonton Eskimos
DE – Alex Hall, Saskatchewan Roughriders
DE – Charleston Hughes, Calgary Stampeders
LB – Adam Bighill, BC Lions
LB – Solomon Elimimian, BC Lions
LB – Juwan Simpson, Calgary Stampeders
CB – Cord Parks, BC Lions
CB – Dante Marsh, BC Lions
DB – Dwight Anderson, Saskatchewan Roughriders
DB – Ryan Phillips, BC Lions
S – Tyron Brackenridge, Saskatchewan Roughriders

Special teams
K – Rene Paredes, Calgary Stampeders
P – Rob Maver, Calgary Stampeders
ST – Larry Taylor, Calgary Stampeders

2013 CFL Eastern All-Stars

Offence
QB – Ricky Ray, Toronto Argonauts
RB – C. J. Gable, Hamilton Tiger-Cats
RB – Will Ford, Winnipeg Blue Bombers
R – Andre Durie, Toronto Argonauts
R – Bakari Grant, Hamilton Tiger-Cats
R – S. J. Green, Montreal Alouettes
R – Chad Owens, Toronto Argonauts
OT – Josh Bourke, Montreal Alouettes
OT – Glenn January, Winnipeg Blue Bombers
OG – Chris Van Zeyl, Toronto Argonauts
OG – Greg Wojt, Hamilton Tiger-Cats
OC – Jeff Keeping, Toronto Argonauts

Defence
DT – Bryant Turner, Winnipeg Blue Bombers
DT – Khalif Mitchell, Toronto Argonauts
DE – John Bowman, Montreal Alouettes
DE – Brandon Boudreaux, Hamilton Tiger-Cats
LB – Chip Cox, Montreal Alouettes
LB – Robert McCune, Toronto Argonauts
LB – Henoc Muamba, Winnipeg Blue Bombers
CB – Geoff Tisdale, Montreal Alouettes
CB – Pat Watkins, Toronto Argonauts
DB – Jerald Brown, Montreal Alouettes
DB – Billy Parker, Montreal Alouettes
S – Mike Edem, Montreal Alouettes

Special teams
K – Sean Whyte, Montreal Alouettes
P – Josh Bartel, Hamilton Tiger-Cats
ST – Marc Beswick, Hamilton Tiger-Cats

2013 Gibson's Finest CFL Awards 
 CFL's Most Outstanding Player Award – Jon Cornish (RB), Calgary Stampeders 
 CFL's Most Outstanding Canadian Award – Jon Cornish (RB), Calgary Stampeders 
 CFL's Most Outstanding Defensive Player Award – Chip Cox (LB), Montreal Alouettes
 CFL's Most Outstanding Offensive Lineman Award – Brendon LaBatte (OG), Saskatchewan Roughriders
 CFL's Most Outstanding Rookie Award – Brett Jones (OL), Calgary Stampeders
 John Agro Special Teams Award – Rene Paredes (K), Calgary Stampeders
 Tom Pate Memorial Award – Kyries Hebert (LB), Montreal Alouettes
 Jake Gaudaur Veterans' Trophy – Shea Emry (LB), Montreal Alouettes 
 Annis Stukus Trophy – Corey Chamblin, Saskatchewan Roughriders
 Commissioner's Award – Dwayne Mandrusiak, Edmonton Eskimos Equipment Manager
 Hugh Campbell Distinguished Leadership Award - no recipient

References

Canadian Football League seasons
2013 in Canadian football